Devil, I'm Bored is a 1993 Russian fantasy drama film directed by Yury Borisov, based on the writings of Thomas Mann, Aleksandr Pushkin, Johann Wolfgang von Goethe.

Plot 
The film tells about a homeless man who is very bored of living. In a market where there is everything, he finds the soul of a ballet dancer.

Cast 
 Oleg Borisov as Mephistopheles / God (last role)
 Yury Posokhov as Faust
 Andrey Kharitonov as Emperor
 Viktoriya Galdikas as Margarita
 Olga Volkova as Witch
 Oleg Vedernikov as Ariel
 Mikhail Shtein as Male
 Lyudmila Ksenofontova as Vixen in the Flemish spirit
 Mariya Ter-Markaryan as Vixen in the French spirit
 Vitali Romanov as Iosif
 Kira Kreylis-Petrova as child trafficker

References

External links 
 

1993 films
1990s Russian-language films
Russian fantasy drama films
Films based on works by Aleksandr Pushkin
Works based on the Faust legend
Lenfilm films
Films based on works by Thomas Mann
1990s fantasy drama films